Thomas Edward Lawes (born 25 December 2002) is an English cricketer. He made his first-class debut on 20 May 2022, for Surrey against the Sri Lanka Cricket Development XI side during their tour of England. He made his Twenty20 debut on 24 June 2022, for Surrey against Essex in the 2022 T20 Blast.

References

External links
 

2002 births
Living people
English cricketers
Surrey cricketers
People educated at Cranleigh School